Long Cane is an unincorporated community in Troup County, in the U.S. state of Georgia. The name sometimes is spelled "Longcane".

History
The community takes its name from nearby Long Cane Creek. A post office called Long Cane was established in 1834, and remained in operation until 1900.

References

Unincorporated communities in Troup County, Georgia